Electrocop is a 1989 action video game developed by Epyx and published by Atari Corporation in North America and Europe for the Atari Lynx. It was released in Japan on November 25 of the same year, where it was distributed by Mumin Corporation. One of the first games written for the platform, it was one of the launch titles that were released along with the system in North America.

Set on a futuristic interpretation of Washington, D.C. in the year 2069, players assume the role of the titular robot created by MegaCorp who must infiltrate into the Steel Complex fortress in an attempt of rescuing the President of the United States' first daughter under a time limit from The Criminal Brain, who kidnapped her for a ransom and threats to kill her if his demand is not met. Conceived by Greg Omi, who also developed the Lynx hardware alongside Chip's Challenge creator Chuck Sommerville, Electrocop began its development prior to the existence of any functional Lynx hardware.

Electrocop has received mixed reception from critics, who unanimously praised the pseudo-3D visuals and sound department, but some criticized the repetitive nature of the gameplay and convoluted graphics. A version of the game was developed and completed by ICC for the Atari 7800 but never released.

Gameplay 

Electrocop is a third-person shooter game in which players starts off with a countdown clock of one hour to complete the task of rescuing the president's daughter. The player has to make their way through different levels coming up against different foes. These foes are robots that go by, Walker, Python, Mine, Wall Cannon, Virus and Stringray. To get between each level players have to hack through different doors through a computer interface. While in this interface there are directories of Information where players can learn more about the robots, Programs that disable robots and help hack through codes, and Games where players can pass the time by playing games of Meteors, Letter Puzzle and Out Break. There is a Med-pack which heals the player, and weapon repair to help fix damaged weapons. There are different weapons to choose from to help in out during the course of the game.

Development and release 

Electrocop was conceived by Greg Omi when he worked at Epyx as games developer and programmer alongside Chuck Sommerville. In an online interview with website The Atari Times, Omi recounted about the development process of the game, stating that work on the project began before any functional Atari Lynx hardware existed and the team were working on an emulator of the console on the Amiga microcomputer at a slow frame rate, in addition of also using a video camera to scan the image in order to test how the graphics would look like once the hardware was finalized, although an early revision of the Lynx capable of displaying raster graphics was made later during development. Omi also stated that he initially had a lack of knowledge of 3D computer graphics and matrices, as he needed a graphical perspective for his project and consulted Blue Lightning programmer Stephen Landrum in how to write it, as the system could not perform sprite rotation.

A long-running rumor was that Electrocop initially started as a 3D sequel to Dennis Caswell's Impossible Mission. However, when asked about this rumor, Omi said "it's funny, but I can't remember if it was supposed to be a sequel to Impossible Mission or not. I remember writing a story and basic game design and pitching it to RJ [Mical], but I don't remember if they were asking for a sequel." Despite being a fan of Impossible Mission and knowing Caswell personally, Omi could not recall if he was still a member of Epyx. Atari composer Alex Rudis was also involved during the production of the project and created the music for it. The introductory sequence was created by Sommerville, who developed an animation engine that would be re-used on other titles for the hardware such as Blue Lightning and Todd's Adventures in Slime World, in addition of the minigame sequences.

Electrocop was one of the original launch titles during the initial release of the Lynx in 1989, along with the aforementioned Blue Lightning, California Games and Gates of Zendocon. It was also released in Europe around the same time period and later in Japan on December 23 of the same year, where it was distributed by Mumin Corporation instead and the difference between the international and Japanese releases is that the latter came bundled with an instruction manual in Japanese. The game was first showcased to the public during the International Summer Consumer Electronics Show 1989 along with the system, though early previews showed the title under the earlier name Net Runner.

Atari 7800 version 

A version of Electrocop was in development by ICC for Atari Corporation on the Atari 7800, focusing on action and platforming instead of the third-person shooter gameplay style from the original Lynx version and was also showcased during an exhibition at the Consumer Electronics Show in a complete state. The 7800 version is notable for being one of the first titles where director and writer Amy Hennig was involved, creating the artwork using Atari ST and Macintosh computers as a freelancer. However, despite Hennig stating that work on the project was completed, this version would never be released due to Atari cancelling its release late during the official life span of the system. In a 2007 forum post at AtariAge, former MicroProse UK employee Steve Goss revealed artwork of the cancelled conversion that was given to him by Hennig herself.

Reception 

Electrocop garnered mixed reception. In a capsule review for STart, Clayton Walnum praised the game's graphics and variety of challenges. Robert A. Jung reviewed the game which was published to IGN Entertainment. In his final verdict he wrote "This cart was a brilliant concept that didn't completely click; the race against the clock and the real-time exploration/combat elements are hampered with uninspired gameplay and little variety. Electrocop's stunning visuals and sounds make it fun to watch, but whether you'd buy a game for its razzle-dazzle is a personal decision." Giving a final score of 7 out of 10.

Legacy 
Greg Omi has stated that no sequel was ever planned to be in development. In 1993, Atari Corp. requested several Epyx titles in order to be converted and release to the then-upcoming Atari Jaguar, with Electrocop among the list of selected titles, although no actual development on a Jaguar version was ever started.

References

External links 
 Electrocop at AtariAge
 Electrocop at GameFAQs
 Electrocop at Giant Bomb
 Electrocop at MobyGames

1989 video games
Action video games
Atari games
Atari Lynx games
Cancelled Atari 7800 games
Cyberpunk video games
Epyx games
Minigames
Run and gun games
Science fiction video games
Single-player video games
Third-person shooters
Video games about police officers
Video games developed in the United States
Video games scored by Alex Rudis
Video games set in the 2060s
Video games set in the future
Video games set in the United States
Video games set in Washington, D.C.